Alessandro Canelli (born 9 June 1971 in Novara) is an Italian politician.

He is a member of the right-wing populist party Lega Nord. Canelli was elected Mayor of Novara on 19 June 2016 and took office on 21 June.

See also
2016 Italian local elections
List of mayors of Novara

References

External links
 
 

1971 births
Living people
Mayors of Novara
People from Novara
Lega Nord politicians